Mondragon is a commune in the Vaucluse department in the Provence-Alpes-Côte d'Azur region in southeastern France.

It is known primarily for the large Donzère-Mondragon Dam across the river Rhône named for it and the town of Donzère.

It was once part of the Comtat Venaissin, an exclave of the Papal States. The coat of arms depicts a globus cruciger.

See also
Communes of the Vaucluse department

References

Communes of Vaucluse